The Rest Haven Cemetery in  Franklin, Tennessee is a  cemetery that was listed on the National Register of Historic Places in 2012.

It is significant in the history of Franklin.  The cemetery was formally founded in 1855 but has some earlier burials, as early as 1841. It has 475 documented graves, including those of 66 Confederate Civil War soldiers. Among the Civil War veterans is Union Brevet Brigadier General James Patton Brownlow (1841–1879).

It is across North Margin Street from Franklin City Cemetery, also NRHP-listed in 2012.

References

External links
 

Cemeteries on the National Register of Historic Places in Tennessee
Buildings and structures in Franklin, Tennessee
1855 establishments in Tennessee
National Register of Historic Places in Williamson County, Tennessee